Stefan Bošković is a Montenegrin writer. He was born in 1983 in Podgorica. He is known for the short story collection Transparentne životinje (2018) and the novel Šamaranje (2014). Another novel Ministar won the EU Prize for Literature. Bošković is also active in other genres, e.g. scripts for feature films and short films, TV sitcoms and documentaries. He has also written plays for the stage.

References

Montenegrin writers
Montenegrin male writers
Living people
Year of birth missing (living people)